HMS Brave may refer to one of the following ships of the Royal Navy:

English ship Brave was a vessel hired by the Crown in 1588.
  was a xebec captured in 1747 and sold in 1748.
  was hired in 1798 and run down by a transport in 1799.
 HMS Brave (1805) was the French 80-gun  Formidable, captured at the Battle of Cape Ortegal in 1805, and broken up in 1816.
 HMS Brave was the ex-French 74-gun Brave, captured on 6 February 1806.  She foundered on 12 April due to damage she had sustained during her capture at the Battle of San Domingo.
  was an  gunboat built by John Laird, Sons & Company in 1856. She was laid up at Haslar after completion and broken up at Portsmouth in 1869.
 , was an  commissioned in 1943 and broken up in 1958.
 HMS Brave was to have been the name of the 1944  subsequently named .
 , a Type 22 frigate first commissioned in 1986 and expended as a target in August 2004.

Battle honours
Armada 1588
Cadiz 1596
South France 1944
Kuwait 1991

See also

 
 The s:

Footnotes and references

 
 

Royal Navy ship names